Yadollah Sahabi (25 February 1905 – 12 April 2002) was a prominent Iranian scholar, writer, reformist and politician. A close associate of Mohammad Mosaddegh and Mehdi Bazargan, Sahabi was an active campaigner for the nationalization of the Iranian oil industry in the 1950s. He was the father of Ezzatollah Sahabi and Fereydun Sahabi.

Sahabi studied at Université Lille Nord de France and majored in Geology. He got his Ph.D. degree in 1936 and was immediately hired by Tehran University, faculty of science. Sahabi was one of the founders of the Freedom Movement of Iran. He was an advocate of pluralism nationalization He was a full professor at Tehran University and well-credited writer.

Sahabi is considered by many Iranians a national hero and an Iranian treasure. He died at the age of 97 in Jam Hospital in Tehran.

See also 
 Ezzatollah Sahabi
 Fereydun Sahabi

References

Academic staff of the University of Tehran
Iranian reformists
1905 births
2002 deaths
Freedom Movement of Iran MPs
People of the Iranian Revolution
Iranian revolutionaries
Members of the 1st Islamic Consultative Assembly
National Front (Iran) politicians
Council of the Islamic Revolution members
Members of the Iranian Committee for the Defense of Freedom and Human Rights
Members of the Association for Defense of Freedom and the Sovereignty of the Iranian Nation